Bromine monochloride, also called bromine(I) chloride, bromochloride, and bromine chloride, is an interhalogen inorganic compound with chemical formula BrCl. It is a very reactive golden yellow gas with boiling point 5 °C and melting point −66 °C. Its CAS number is 13863-41-7, and its EINECS number is 237-601-4. It is a strong oxidizing agent.

Uses
Bromine monochloride is used in analytical chemistry in determining low levels of mercury, to quantitatively oxidize mercury in the sample to Hg(II) state.

A common use of bromine monochloride is as an algaecide, fungicide, and disinfectant of industrial recirculating cooling water systems.

Addition of bromine monochloride is used in some types of Li-SO2 batteries to increase voltage and energy density.

See also
 List of highly toxic gases
 Interhalogen compounds

References

Chlorides
Bromine(I) compounds
Interhalogen compounds
Diatomic molecules
Fungicides
Pesticides
Disinfectants
Oxidizing agents
Gases with color